Ranotsara Nord (or: Ranotsara Avaratra) is a rural municipality in Madagascar. It belongs to the district of Iakora, which is a part of Ihorombe Region. The population of the commune was 3,533 in 2018.

Ranotsara Nord has a riverine harbour. Primary and junior level secondary education are available in town. The majority 95% of the population of the municipality are farmers, while an additional 4% receives their livelihood from raising livestock. The most important crop is rice, while other important products are peanuts and beans. Services provide employment for 1% of the population.

It is situated at the Ionaivo river and the unpaved National road 16.

Mining
The region is rich in deposits of sapphires, ruby and chrysoberyl.

References

Populated places in Ihorombe